A logical graph is a special type of diagrammatic structure in any one of several systems of graphical syntax that Charles Sanders Peirce developed for logic.

In his papers on qualitative logic, entitative graphs, and existential graphs, Peirce developed several versions of a graphical formalism, or a graph-theoretic formal language, designed to be interpreted for logic.

In the century since Peirce initiated this line of development, a variety of formal systems have branched out from what is abstractly the same formal base of graph-theoretic structures.

See also
 Charles Sanders Peirce bibliography
 Conceptual graph
 Propositional calculus
 Truth table
 Venn diagram

External links

 Logical Graph @ Commens Dictionary of Peirce's Terms
 Existential Graphs, Jay Zeman, ed., U. of Florida. With 4 works by Peirce.
 Frithjof Dau's page of readings and links on existential graphs includes lists of: books exclusively on existential graphs; books containing existential graphs; articles; and some links and downloadables.
 The literature of C.S. Peirce’s Existential Graphs (via Internet Archive), Xin-Wen Liu, Institute of Philosophy, Chinese Academy of Social Sciences, Beijing, PRC. A whole lot there.

Mathematical logic
Charles Sanders Peirce
Diagrams